Néstor Montoya (April 14, 1862 – January 13, 1923) was a United States representative from New Mexico. As an editor and politician, Néstor Montoya dedicated himself to the inclusion of Hispanics in the political and social life of New Mexico, and to the campaign for New Mexico statehood.

Biography

Early life 
He was born in Albuquerque, New Mexico to Teodosio and Encarnación (Cervantes) Montoya where he attended the public schools. In 1881, he graduated from St. Michael's College, Santa Fe, New Mexico. After graduation, he worked as a postal clerk for the U.S. Post Office in Santa Fe, and later at the U.S. Treasury Office there. He began newspaper work in 1889 and owned and edited the Spanish paper called La bandera americana.

Politics career 
Montoya was member of the New Mexico Territorial House of Representatives 1892–1903 and served as speaker in the latter year. He was a member of the New Mexico Territorial Senate in 1905 and 1906. He was president of the New Mexico Press Association 1908–1923. He was a delegate to the convention that drafted and adopted the state Constitution of New Mexico in 1910 and a regent of the University of New Mexico 1916–1919. He helped write provisions into the Constitution of New Mexico to protect the rights of Hispanics in the areas of education, voting, and civil liberties. Also, he was a member of the Council of National Defense 1917–1919.

Montoya was the chairman of the Bernalillo County, New Mexico draft board during the First World War and clerk of Bernalillo County in 1919 and 1920. He was elected as a Republican to the Sixty-seventh Congress and served from March 4, 1921, until his death in Washington, D.C. in 1923. While in Congress, Montoya served on the Indian Affairs Committee, and the Committee on Public Lands. The Republican Party did not renominate him for a second term and instead they nominated Adelina Otero-Warren. He was buried in Santa Barbara Cemetery in Albuquerque.

Death
At the age of 60, Representative Montoya died suddenly at his home in Washington while preparing to go to work after an absence of two days for illness.  He was shaving when he suffered a stroke and collapsed.

See also 
List of Hispanic and Latino Americans in the United States Congress
List of United States Congress members who died in office (1900–49)

References 

NÉSTOR MONTOYA - From the Library of Congress.
Vigil, Maurilio. Los Patrones: Profiles of Hispanic Political Leaders in New Mexico History, Washington, D.C.: University Press of America, 1980.
 Nestor Montoya, late a representative

1862 births
1923 deaths
19th-century American newspaper editors
19th-century American newspaper publishers (people)
20th-century American politicians
American politicians of Mexican descent
County clerks in New Mexico
Hispanic and Latino American members of the United States Congress
Journalists from New Mexico
Members of the New Mexico Territorial Legislature
Politicians from Albuquerque, New Mexico
Publishers (people) of Spanish-language newspapers in the United States
Republican Party members of the United States House of Representatives from New Mexico
Santa Fe University of Art and Design alumni
Hispanic and Latino American people in New Mexico politics